Yaakov Eliezer Kahana Shapira (born 26 December 1950) is the rosh yeshiva of the Mercaz HaRav yeshiva in Jerusalem and a member of the Chief Rabbinate Council.

Biography
Shapiro was born in Jerusalem to Rabbi Avraham Shapira, the previous Rosh Yeshiva of Mercaz HaRav, and his wife, Penina Perl. He studied in the Yashlatz yeshiva high school, and then at Yeshivat Mercaz Harav.  He was ordained by his father and Rabbi Shaul Yisraeli.

Rabbinic career
In 1983, his father appointed him as a lecturer in Mercaz Harav, and until 1993, he served as his father's right-hand man in the Chief Rabbinate. After his father's death in 2007, Rabbi Yaakov Shapira was appointed Rosh Yeshiva, in accordance with his father's will.

In 2008, during his first year as Rosh Yeshiva, an Arab from Jabel Mukaber in East Jerusalem entered the yeshiva with a gun and began firing indiscriminately, killing eight students and wounding 15 others.

In 2013, Rabbi Shapira competed for the position of Ashkenazi Chief Rabbi of Israel, but lost to Rabbi David Lau. In October 2014, he submitted his candidacy for the position of Chief Rabbi of Jerusalem, but withdrew from the race on election day.

References

1950 births
Living people
Religious Zionist rosh yeshivas
Mercaz HaRav alumni
Rabbis in Jerusalem